Farouq Limouri (born 15 March 2003) is a Dutch-Moroccan footballer on the books for Sparta Rotterdam.

Career
Limouri played in the youth academy of Feyenoord before joining Sparta Rotterdam. He signed his first contract in January 2021, to run until 2023. After joining SC Telstar on loan he made his professional football debut in the Eerste Divisie on February 19, 2021, in a 1-1 draw at home against FC Eindhoven, an experience he described as a “dream come true”. In August, 2021 a match between Jong Sparta and Koninklijke HFC was abandoned after a head injury to Limouri caused an ambulance to have come to the pitch and take him to hospital with concussion from an accidental collision with an opposing player, American youth international Desevio Payne.

International career
In June, 2021 Limouri was called up the Moroccan squad for the 2021 Arab Cup U-20 held in Egypt. Limouri was called up to the Netherlands U19 squad in October 2021.

References

External links
 

Living people
2003 births
Dutch footballers
Eerste Divisie players
Dutch people of Moroccan descent